= John Baker (Horsham MP) =

English politician

John Baker (fl. 1362–1392) was an English politician. He sat as MP for Horsham in September 1388.
